George Smith Lindsey (December 17, 1928 – May 6, 2012) was an American actor and stand-up comedian, best known for his role as Goober Pyle on The Andy Griffith Show, Mayberry R.F.D. and his subsequent tenure on Hee-Haw.

Life and career

George Lindsey was born in Fairfield, Alabama, to George Ross Lindsey (a butcher) and Alice Smith. He was raised by his grandparents in the small town of Jasper, where he graduated from Walker County High School in 1946. He attended Kemper Military School in Boonville, Missouri, and Florence State Teacher's College (Florence, Alabama) (now the University of North Alabama), where he majored in physical education and biology. He was a quarterback on the football team, and acted in college plays. He received a Bachelor of Science in 1952.

After graduating from college he enlisted in the United States Air Force and was stationed at Ramey Air Force Base in Puerto Rico. After his discharge, he taught for a year at Hazel Green High School in Hazel Green, Alabama, while waiting to be accepted by the American Theater Wing in New York City in 1956.  On March 24, 1960, he appeared on the To Tell the Truth television quiz show, posing as a Florida spear fisherman and ultimately revealing himself as a "nightclub comic". After graduating from the Wing and performing in two Broadway plays, "Wonderful Town" and "All American", he moved to Los Angeles in 1962.  He got parts in TV series including Gunsmoke, The Rifleman, The Real McCoys, The Twilight Zone, Daniel Boone, Voyage to the Bottom of the Sea and three episodes of The Alfred Hitchcock Hour, before he got the role he would become famous for as "Goober" on The Andy Griffith Show.

The Andy Griffith Show, as Goober Pyle (1964)
In 1964, Lindsey was cast as the slow-witted but kindly Goober Beasley on The Andy Griffith Show. His character was later renamed Goober Pyle to tie him to his cousin Gomer Pyle, a slow-witted country boy played by Jim Nabors, also from Alabama. Goober's antics frequently included his exaggerated Goober Dance and his comically bad Cary Grant impression.

As Lindsey started his portrayal as Goober, he also had a minor role in the Walter Brennan series The Tycoon on ABC. Lindsey played a sailor in the 1964 film Ensign Pulver, the sequel to Mister Roberts. He also had a role in a Voyage to the Bottom of the Sea episode entitled "Submarine Sunk Here". He appeared in six episodes of the television series Gunsmoke. He played a blackmailing taxicab]driver in the "Bed of Roses" episode of The Alfred Hitchcock Hour.

Star Trek, cast as Spock
During an interview segment of TV Land's 40th Anniversary Star Trek Marathon on November 12, 2006, Leonard Nimoy stated that Gene Roddenberry's first choice to play Spock was George Lindsey. Because of the flippant way Nimoy makes the comment, it has been suggested that he was joking. The claim Lindsey was offered the role is given more credibility when Lindsey's close friend Ernest Borgnine wrote in his autobiography, "my hand to God – he turned down the part of Mr. Spock on TV's Star Trek, the role that made Leonard Nimoy famous."

Mayberry R.F.D., other acting work
After Griffith left his television show, CBS retooled it as Mayberry R.F.D. and Lindsey played the same character until CBS cancelled the program in 1971.

In 1972, Lindsey portrayed Charlie, one of a pair of highwaymen in the Gunsmoke episode "Blind Man's Bluff," and an escaped convict, "The Dove," in an episode of The Rifleman. Disney used his talents in a few projects, both as comedy support in features (Snowball Express) and voiceovers for a few of their animated characters. Three Disney animated features that presented the voice of Lindsey were The Aristocats (1970), Robin Hood (1973) and The Rescuers (1977). He appeared in the 1967 Gunsmoke episode "Mad Dog" as one of the Watson Brothers.
In 1978, Lindsey guest starred on M*A*S*H as Roy Dupree, a wild but capable Southern surgeon. In 1997 Lindsey played himself in an episode of NewsRadio.

As Goober on Hee Haw (1972–1992)

Lindsey portrayed Goober for the third and last time on the syndicated country music variety show Hee Haw, playing a more rustic and somewhat smarter version of the character. He appeared on that show from 1972 to 1992.

Death
Lindsey died on May 6, 2012, in Nashville, Tennessee, from heart failure. He was 83. He is buried at Oak Hill Cemetery in his hometown of Jasper, Alabama.

Honors and citations
Lindsey raised over US$1,000,000 for Alabama Special Olympics through 17 years of the George Lindsey Celebrity Weekend and Golf Tournament in Montgomery, Alabama and another $50,000 for the Alabama Association of Retarded Citizens, and participated as Head Coach-Winter Games in the Minneapolis, Minnesota Special Olympics National Competition.

He established and perpetuated the George Lindsey Academic Scholarships at University of North Alabama. In 1992, the university gave him an honorary doctorate.

Lindsey was the 1995 recipient of the Governor's Achievement Award — Alabama Music Hall of Fame. The State of Alabama named the "George Lindsey Highway" in Jasper, Alabama after the actor. In 1998, he established the George Lindsey/UNA Film Festival that takes place at the University of North Alabama annually in the spring.

He was the 1997 recipient of the Minnie Pearl Lifetime Achievement Award and the 2007 recipient of the first ICON Award presented by the Nashville Associations of Talent Directors.

Partial filmography
Death Valley Days TV Series - The Death and the Fury (1964)
The Twilight Zone TV Series – Deputy Pierce in the 1964 episode 'I Am the Night -- Color Me Black'
The Andy Griffith Show CBS TV Series (1964–1968) – Goober Pyle
Ensign Pulver (1964) – Lindstrom
The Joey Bishop Show TV Series (1964) – Marine
Gunsmoke (“Pa Hacks Brood” - 1963) as Orville; (“Which Doctor” - 1966) as Skeeter; (“Mad Dog” - 1967) as Pinto Watson;  & (“Blind Mans Bluff” - 1972) as Charlie
Mayberry R.F.D. TV Series (1968–1971) – Goober
The Aristocats (1970) – Lafayette (voice)
Snowball Express (1972) – Double L. Dingman
Charley and the Angel (1973) – Pete, Handyman
Robin Hood (1973) – Trigger, the Vulture (voice)
Treasure of Matecumbe (1976) – Coahoma Sheriff
The Rescuers (1977) – Deadeye, The Rabbit (voice)
M*A*S*H (TV series) – Captain Roy Dupree in the 1978 episode 'Temporary Duty'
Take This Job and Shove It (1981) – Man at Gas Station
The American Snitch (1983) – Zeke
Cannonball Run II (1984) – Uncle Cal
Return to Mayberry (1986) – Goober Pyle
NewsRadio (1997) - HimselfWhen I Find the Ocean'' (2006) – Ed Barker (final film role)

Autobiography

References

External links
 
 
 
 George Lindsey UNA Film Festival
 

1928 births
2012 deaths
Male actors from Alabama
American male film actors
American male television actors
People from Nashville, Tennessee
United States Air Force airmen
University of North Alabama alumni
North Alabama Lions football players
Writers from Alabama
People from Fairfield, Alabama
People from Jasper, Alabama